is a junction railway station in the city of Akita, Akita Prefecture, Japan, operated by East Japan Railway Company (JR East).

Lines

Shinkansen
 Komachi (–Akita)

Limited Express
 Tsugaru (Akita–)
 Inaho (––Akita)

Station layout

The station is an elevated station, consisting of four island platforms serving eight tracks for regular trains, and two bay platforms for the Akita Shinkansen. The station has a "Midori no Madoguchi" staffed ticket office and a View Plaza travel agency.

Platforms

History 

Akita Station opened on 21 October 1902. The station was absorbed into the JR East network upon the privatization of JNR on 1 April 1987. The station's building was renovated in 1997.

Passenger statistics
In fiscal 2018, the station was used by an average of 10,733  passengers daily (boarding passengers only). The passenger figures for previous years are as shown below.

Surrounding area
 Akita Station building "" (department store near the west entrance)
 Akita Northern Gate Square
 Akitaekimae post office
  (shopping/hotel complex near the east entrance)
 Kanto festival (five-minute walk from the west entrance)

Bus terminals

Long-distance buses 
 For Yokote Station, Jūmonji, Yuzawa Station
 For Noshiro Station
 Senshu; For Sendai Station (Miyagi)
 Flora; For Shinjuku Station
 Dream Akita/Yokohama; For Tokyo Station and Yokohama Station

See also
 List of railway stations in Japan

References

External links

 JR East station information 

Akita Shinkansen
JR East Akita Peckers
Ōu Main Line
Railway stations in Akita Prefecture
Uetsu Main Line
Railway stations in Japan opened in 1902
Buildings and structures in Akita (city)
Transport in Akita City